William Weston Elwes  (1845-1901)  was an Anglican Archdeacon in India in the late 19th and early 20th centuries.
 
Elwes was born in Lexden and educated at Ipswich School. He graduated from Trinity College, Cambridge in 1867;  and was ordained in 1868. After a curacy in Tunbridge Wells he went as a Chaplain to Madras. He served at Vizagapatam, Trichinopoly, Coimbatore and Ootacamund. He was Archdeacon of Madras from 1893 to 1900.

He died on 22 May 1901: his son Frederick Fenn Elwes, was Principal of the Medical College, Madras.

References

19th-century Indian Anglican priests
Alumni of Trinity College, Cambridge
Archdeacons of Madras
People from Colchester
1845 births
1901 deaths
People educated at Ipswich School